Gary McClure is a former American college baseball coach, formerly serving as head coach of the Austin Peay Governors baseball program.  He was named to that position prior to the 1988 season.  With 847 wins, McClure is the winningest coach in Austin Peay baseball history, as well as the winningest coach in Ohio Valley Conference baseball history.

McClure played two years at Southeastern Community College in Iowa before completing his eligibility at Cumberland.  He then completed his degree at Austin Peay, and served as a student assistant coach.  With the retirement of then-coach Billy Merkel, McClure was hired as head coach just two years removed from his playing days.  Under McClure, the Governors won thirteen regular season and tournament OVC titles. They appeared in six NCAA Regionals.  McClure has coached six major league players (Jamie "Cat" Walker-Royals, Tigers, Orioles), (George Sherrill-Mariners, Orioles, Dodgers, Braves) (AJ Ellis-Dodgers, Marlins, Padres), (Shawn Kelley-Mariners, Yankees, Nationals), (Matt Reynolds-Rockies, Diamondbacks, Giants), (Ryan Harper-Mariners). McClure was inducted into the Austin Peay Athletic Hall of Fame in 2012. McClure has been a candidate for several major conference coaching vacancies, most recently at Iowa.  He withdrew his name from consideration for the Iowa position in the summer of 2013, electing to remain at Austin Peay.

McClure was hired by the Battle Creek Bombers of the North Woods League in 2016 where his team finished with a record of 40-33 while going 21-16 in the second half. They made the playoffs for only the second time in the team's ten year history. They beat the Madison Mallards in the first round and then lost in the semifinals to the Rapids Rafters, the eventual 2016 champion.

In 2017, McClure was hired by the Kokomo Jackrabbits. In 2019, he was hired as manager of the Milwaukee Milkmen for their inaugural 2019 season in the American Association of Independent Professional Baseball but was not retained for 2020 following the team's 38-62 performance. In 2021 McClure was hired as the Manager by the Burlington Bee's for its inaugural season in the Prospect League a collegiate summer Baseball league in Burlington Iowa.

Head coaching record
This table shows McClure's record as a collegiate head coach.

See also
List of current NCAA Division I baseball coaches

References

Living people
Baseball shortstops
Austin Peay State University alumni
Austin Peay Governors baseball coaches
Cumberland Phoenix baseball players
Southeastern Blackhawks baseball players
1964 births